Frequencies is the debut studio album by British electronic music duo LFO, released on 22 July 1991 by Warp. It peaked at No. 42 on the UK Albums Chart and was released to universal acclaim.

Background
Warp originally signed LFO in 1990 after DJ Martin played their tracks at Leeds Warehouse. The duo were both 19 years old when they recorded their debut LP. According to Mark Bell, most of the album was made by him alone because Varley felt "trapped by the confines of Warp" and wanted to make more direct dance music; the credits were nonetheless split 50/50.

Release 
Frequencies was originally released by Warp in the United Kingdom, while it was later released by Tommy Boy Records in the United States. The US edition of the album alters the track listing slightly, inserting "Track 14", which concludes the UK edition, in between "We Are Back" and "Tan Ta Ra"; the rest of the tracks then proceed in the same order as the UK edition.

"LFO", "We Are Back", and "What Is House? (LFO Remix)" (an expanded version of "Intro") were released as singles.

Critical reception 

In 2006, Frequencies was named by The Observer as one of the "50 albums that changed music".

In 2012, Fact placed Frequencies at number 47 on its list of the "100 Best Albums of the 1990s". In a 2013 article for Fact, critic Simon Reynolds named it as "one of electronic dance music’s All Time Top 5 Albums".

In 2015, NME placed it at number 47 on its list of "100 Lost Albums You Need to Know". Mixmag included the album in its 2018 list of the 50 most influential dance music albums of all time.

Legacy
In 2009, the Warp20 (Recreated) compilation featured covers of "LFO" and "What Is House? (LFO Remix)" by Luke Vibert and Autechre, respectively.

Track listing

Charts

References

External links 
 

1991 debut albums
Acid house albums
Techno albums by English artists
LFO (British band) albums
Tommy Boy Records albums
Warp (record label) albums
Albums with cover art by The Designers Republic